Maria Rosa Antognazza (born 1964) is an Italian-British philosopher who serves as professor of philosophy at King's College London.

Academic career

Antognazza was educated at the Catholic University of Milan. She has held research fellowships and visiting professorships in Italy, Germany, Israel, Great Britain, Switzerland, and the US, including a British Academy Postdoctoral Fellowship, a two-year research fellowship from the Leverhulme Trust, and the Leibniz-Professorship  in Leipzig in 2016. She was awarded the 2019–2020 Mind Senior Research Fellowship for work on her book Thinking with Assent: Renewing a Traditional Account of Knowledge and Belief.

She served as head of the King's philosophy department from 2011/12 to 2014/15.  She is the chair of the British Society for the History of Philosophy and the president of the British Society for the Philosophy of Religion.

She was the winner of the Pfizer Award in 2010.

Selected publications

Single-authored
Thinking with Assent: Renewing a Traditional Account of Knowledge and Belief (Oxford University Press)
Leibniz: A Very Short Introduction (Oxford: Oxford University Press, 2016)
Leibniz: An Intellectual Biography (Cambridge: Cambridge University Press, 2009; winner of the 2010 Pfizer Award)
Leibniz on the Trinity and the Incarnation: Reason and Revelation in the Seventeenth Century (New Haven: Yale University Press, 2007).

Edited volume
The Oxford Handbook of Leibniz. Oxford: Oxford University Press, 2018.

References

1964 births
21st-century British philosophers
21st-century Italian philosophers
Academics of King's College London
Academics of the University of Aberdeen
British women philosophers
Epistemologists
Gottfried Wilhelm Leibniz scholars
Italian women philosophers
Living people
Philosophers of religion
Università Cattolica del Sacro Cuore alumni